Pablo Palacios Alvarenga (born 22 June 1988 in Coronel Oviedo, Paraguay) is a Paraguayan association footballer who plays as a striker for Gimnasia y Esgrima de Mendoza in the Argentine Torneo Federal A.

Career
His debut season was in the 2009 Primera División Paraguaya with Tacuary.

In the 2016/17 season, he signed with Gimnasia y Esgrima de Mendoza in the Argentine Torneo Federal A, where the club was close to obtaining promotion and the player finished the season as the league's leading goal scorer with 21 goals.

References

External links

1988 births
Living people
Paraguayan footballers
Paraguayan expatriate footballers
Paraguayan Primera División players
Torneo Federal A players
Club Tacuary footballers
Club Sportivo San Lorenzo footballers
Gimnasia y Esgrima de Mendoza footballers
Expatriate footballers in Argentina
Association football forwards